Los Motivos de Luz (Luz' Motive) is a 1985 Mexican drama film, directed by Felipe Cazals. The film stars Patricia Reyes Spíndola, as Luz, a woman accused of murdering her four children, after being accused by her husband (Alonso Echánove) and her mother-in-law (Ana Ofelia Murguía). Los Motivos de Luz was written by Xavier Robles based on the real case of Elvia Luz Cruz. The film received two Ariel Awards in 1986, for Best Actress (Spindola) and Best Supporting Actress (Murguía).

Main cast
Patricia Reyes Spíndola as Luz
Alonso Echánove as Sebastián
Ana Ofelia Murguía as Luz Mother-in-law
Delia Casanova as Dr. Maricarmen Rebollar
Marta Aura as Lawyer Marisela Alférez
Dunia Saldívar as neighbor inmate

Awards

Ariel Awards
The Ariel Awards are awarded annually by the Mexican Academy of Film Arts and Sciences in Mexico. Los Motivos de Luz received two awards out of seven nominations.

|-
|rowspan="7" scope="row"| 28th Ariel Awards
|scope="row"| Los Motivos de Luz
|scope="row"| Best Picture
| 

|-
|scope="row"| Felipe Cazals
|scope="row"| Best Director
| 
|-
|scope="row"| Alonso Echánove
|rowspan="1" scope="row"| Best Actor
| 
|-
|scope="row"| Patricia Reyes Spíndola
|rowspan="1" scope="row"| Best Actress
| 
|-
|scope="row"| Ana Ofelia Murguía
|rowspan="2" scope="row"| Best Supporting Actress
| 
|-
|scope="row"| Dunia Zaldívar
| 
|-
|scope="row"| Horacio Martínez
|rowspan="1" scope="row"| Best Art Direction
| 
|-

External links

References

1985 films
1985 drama films
Mexican drama films
1980s Spanish-language films
1980s Mexican films